Pantylidae is an extinct family of lepospondyl amphibians and often considered a sister-group to the family Tuditanidae.  The family contains two genera Pantylus and Stegotretus, while a third, Sparodus, is sometimes placed here as well.

References

Recumbirostrans